Ishmuratovo (İşmorat) is a rural locality (a village) in Staroisayevsky Selsoviet, Nurimanovsky District, Bashkortostan, Russia. The population was 223 as of 2010. There are 3 streets.

Geography 
Ishmuratovo is located 21 km southeast of Krasnaya Gorka (the district's administrative centre) by road. Staroisayevo is the nearest rural locality.

References 

Rural localities in Nurimanovsky District